Grangea is a genus of flowering plants in the family Asteraceae.

 Species
 Grangea anthemoides O.Hoffm. - Angola, Botswana, Zambia, Namibia
 Grangea ceruanoides Cass. - Sahel region from Mauritania to Sudan
 Grangea gossypina (Baker) Fayed - Madagascar
 Grangea jeffreyana Fayed - Burundi
 Grangea lyrata (DC.) Fayed - Madagascar
 Grangea madagascariensis Vatke - Madagascar
 Grangea maderaspatana (L.) Poir. - widespread in Africa and tropical Asia
 Grangea zambesiaca Fayed - Zambia

References

Astereae
Asteraceae genera
Taxa named by Michel Adanson